Mandlik is a surname. Notable people with the surname include:

Babita Mandlik, Indian cricketer
Elizabeth Mandlik, American tennis player. 
Hana Mandlíková, Czech tennis player
Rambhau Mandlik, Indian politician
Sadashivrao Dadoba Mandlik, Indian politician
Vilém Mandlík, Czech athlete, father of Hana
Vishvanath Narayan Mandlik, Indian lawyer